The Parliament of Padania, the former Nord and former Parliament House of Mantua, is a body set up by Lega Nord with its internal representation almost electoral basin. It consists of all administrators, regional councillors, mayors and elected MPs in various local and national administrations. The first official headquarters of the plenary meetings of the newborn Po Parliament took place in Villa Riva Berni to Bagnolo San Vito (MN).
The second seat in the 2007-2011 of the meetings was located in Vicenza in villa Bonin Maistrello, via dell'oreficeria 21.

The Parliament of Padania is divided internally into competing political forces, which shall, while always referring to the political thinking of the Northern League, inspired names so creative in various political ideologies which, in common sense, there is nothing to share with the League thought.

In the general election of 1997 took part also the Movement Pannella-Reformers candidates were put forward the valtellinese Benedetto Della Vedova, who was elected within the Assembly.

Are elected, at the gazebo of the Northern League, every five years, the representatives of the parties and the Prime Minister of Padania. The Prime Ministers, in chronological order, from 1996 are: Giancarlo Pagliarini, Vito Gnutti, Manuela Dal Lago, Mario Borghezio, Francesco Speroni and Roberto Maroni.

The February 10, 2007, at the request of Federal Secretary of Lega Nord, Umberto Bossi's Padania Parliament officially reopens its doors based in Vicenza, in the villa Bonin Maistrello.

With Silvio Berlusconi's resignation, the end of the Berlusconi IV Cabinet and the beginning of The Government the political Secretariat November 14, 2011 of the Northern League decided to reopen the Parliament of Padania

The December 4, 2011 has been appointed the new President of the Parliament of Padania, Roberto Calderoli at the opening of the Assembly took part for the first time representatives of twenty Leaguers Umbrian militants representing the "nation" of Umbria under parent company League at the Regional Council of Umbria, Gianluca Cirignoni.

By 2012 has an Office in Port Villa called La Favorita in locality Monticello di Fara di Sarego (VI).

Organs

President of the Parliament
 1997-2001 - Francesco Speroni (Liberal Democrats - Forward Padania)
 2001-2007 - Closed/Vacant 
 2007-2011 - Roberto Maroni (European Democrats - Padanian Labour)
 2011–present - Roberto Calderoli (Independent)

Prime minister of Padania
 1996-1998 - Giancarlo Pagliarini (Liberal Democrats - Forward Padania)
 1998-1999 - Vito Gnutti (Liberal Democrats - Forward Padania)
 1999-2004 - Manuela Dal Lago (Liberal independent)
 2004-2009 - Mario Borghezio (Padanian Right - European Alliance)
 2009-2012 - Francesco Speroni (Liberal Democrats - Forward Padania)
 2012–present - Roberto Maroni (Padanian Socialists - Labour and Society)

Internal political parties of Lega Nord

Left-wing
 Padanian Communists (PRC) - Leader: Matteo Salvini

Centre-left
 Padanian Socialists - Labour and Society (PD/PSI) - Leader: Roberto Maroni

Centre
 Padanian Catholics (UdC) - Leader: Giuseppe Leoni

Centre-right
 Liberal and libertarian Padania (Italian Radicals/ML) - Leader: Marco Pottino
 Liberal Democrats - Forward Padania (FI) - Leader: Roberto Cota

Right-wing
Padanian Right - European Alliance (The Right) - Leader: Enzo Flego

Autonomist
 Padanian Lions (Liga Veneta) - Leader: Flavio Tosi
 Nation Lombardy (Lega Lombarda) - Leader: Matteo Salvini

Political organisations based in Italy